Hexafluorotitanic acid (systematically named oxonium hexafluoridotitanate(2-)) is an inorganic compound with the chemical formula (H3O)(H5O2)[TiF6].  According to X-ray crystallography, the salt consists of [TiF6]2- octahedral and two kinds of oxonium cations, (H3O)+ and (H5O2)+.  

As with most oxonium salts, it is only stable in acidic solution. Under basic conditions, closely related salts hydrolyse to a hydrated titanium dioxide:

A related salt is the anhydrous fluoronium hexafluoridotitanate(2-) or (H2F)2[TiF6].

References

Fluorine compounds
Titanium(IV) compounds
Fluorometallates